In mathematics, an absorbing element (or annihilating element) is a special type of element of a set with respect to a binary operation on that set.  The result of combining an absorbing element with any element of the set is the absorbing element itself. In semigroup theory, the absorbing element is called a zero element because there is no risk of confusion with other notions of zero, with the notable exception: under additive notation zero may, quite naturally, denote the neutral element of a monoid. In this article "zero element" and "absorbing element" are synonymous.

Definition 
Formally, let  be a set S with a closed binary operation • on it (known as a magma). A zero element is an element z such that for all s in S, . This notion can be refined to the notions of left zero, where one requires only that , and right zero, where .

Absorbing elements are particularly interesting for semigroups, especially the multiplicative semigroup of a semiring. In the case of a semiring with 0, the definition of an absorbing element is sometimes relaxed so that it is not required to absorb 0; otherwise, 0 would be the only absorbing element.

Properties
 If a magma has both a left zero z and a right zero z′, then it has a zero, since .
 A magma can have at most one zero element.

Examples
The most well known example of an absorbing element comes from elementary algebra, where any number multiplied by zero equals zero.  Zero is thus an absorbing element.
The zero of any ring is also an absorbing element. For an element r of a ring R, r0=r(0+0)=r0+r0, so 0=r0, as zero is the unique element a for which r-r=a for any r in the ring R. This property holds true also in a rng since multiplicative identity isn't required.
 Floating point arithmetics as defined in IEEE-754 standard contains a special value called Not-a-Number ("NaN"). It is an absorbing element for every operation; i.e., etc.
 The set of binary relations over a set X, together with the composition of relations forms a monoid with zero, where the zero element is the empty relation (empty set).
 More examples:

See also
Idempotent (ring theory)an element x of a ring such that x2 = x
Identity element
Null semigroup

Notes

References

 M. Kilp, U. Knauer, A.V. Mikhalev, Monoids, Acts and Categories with Applications to Wreath Products and Graphs, De Gruyter Expositions in Mathematics vol. 29, Walter de Gruyter, 2000, .

External links
 Absorbing element at PlanetMath

Semigroup theory
Absorbing element
Algebraic properties of elements